Miklyaikha is a rural locality (a village) in Razdolyevskoye Rural Settlement, Kolchuginsky District, Vladimir Oblast, Russia. The population was 3 as of 2010.

Geography 
Miklyaikha is located 21 km south of Kolchugino (the district's administrative centre) by road. Panteleyevo is the nearest rural locality.

References 

Rural localities in Kolchuginsky District